Stanislav Iosifovich Rostotsky (21 April 1922, in Rybinsk – 10 August 2001, in Vyborg) was a Soviet film director and screenwriter, the recipient of the two USSR State Prizes and a Lenin Prize. He was named People's Artist of the USSR in 1974.

Early years 
Stanislav Rostotsky was born in Rybinsk on 21 April 1922 into a Russian-Polish family. His grandfather Boleslaw Rostotsky served as a General in the Imperial Russian Army and a prosecutor on Emperor's personal order. His father Iosif Boleslawovich Rostotsky (1890—1965) was an acclaimed doctor, docent, author of 200 monographs, as well as a secretary of the Scientific Medical Council at the People's Commissariat for Health. His mother Lidia Karlovna Rostotskaya (1882—1964) was a milliner turned a housewife; she was half-French.<ref>Irina Zaichik. Interview with Marianna Rostotskaya at Story Caravan, November 2011 (in Russian)</ref> His brother Boleslaw Norbert Iosifovich Rostotsky (1912—1981) was a famous theater historian.Rostotsky Boleslaw Norbert Iosifovich article from the Great Soviet Encyclopedia, 1969—1978 (in Russian)

At the age of five, Stanilsav watched Battleship Potemkin and became obsessed with cinema. In 1936 he met Sergei Eisenstein and took part in his unfinished Bezhin Meadow movie as an actor. Eisenstein became his teacher and good friend later on. He convinced Stanislav that only a well-read and educated person may become a film director. This influenced his decision to enter the Institute of Philosophy and Literature in 1940, with an intention to enter VGIK.Islands. Stanislav Rostosky documentary by Russia-K, 2007 (in Russian)

In 1942 he was enrolled in the Red Army. He left for the front line in a year. He served as a photojournalist in the 6th cavalry corps and traveled from Vyazma through Smolensk to Rivne. In 1944 Rostotsky was seriously injured during the fight near Dubno when he was driven over by a Nazi tank. He survived only due to a trench where his body was partly buried. According to Rostotsky, one of his legs was ruined, as well as his rib cage and his hand. "In addition, a shell fragment hurt me in the head... Good thing the mates took my gun away — otherwise I would've probably shot myself. Because I spent 22 hours lying in that swamp, losing my consciousness, so I had time to think".

He was saved by one of the passing soldiers and then — by a front nurse Anna Chugunova who carried him to the hospital. Rostotsky later dedicated his film The Dawns Here Are Quiet to her. As a result of gangrene he lost one of his legs (a below-knee amputation). He wore a prosthesis, yet never mentioned it and led an active life. Many people working with him didn't even realise he was disabled. He refused to use a walking stick despite the pain, especially during later years.

He was awarded the 1st class Order of the Patriotic War and the Order of the Red Star.

 Career 
During September 1944 at the age of 22 Stanislav joined VGIK to become a film director. His teacher was Grigori Kozintsev. He studied for seven years, simultaneously working as Kozintsev's assistant at the Lenfilm studio. In 1952 Rostotsky directed his graduation movie Ways-Roads. During the audition he met his future wife, an actress Nina Menshikova. Rostotsky received good recommendations and was sent to work at the Gorky Film Studio where he spent the next 35 years.

Between 1955 and 1989 Rostotsky directed and co-directed 12 motion pictures, one short film and one documentary Profession: Film Actor (1979) dedicated to his close friend Vyacheslav Tikhonov who started in five of his movies in the leading roles. Unlike many other directors, he cast his wife only once, in a supporting role in the film We'll Live Till Monday (1968). Their son — Andrei Rostotsky, a professional actor and stuntman — was also given only one role in the historical war picture A Squadron of Flying Hussars (1980) co-directed by Stanislav under a pseudonym of Stepan Stepanov. War was a running theme in most of his movies, referred to either directly or indirectly. He was named a People's Artist of the USSR in 1974.

He also served as a teacher at VGIK and the President of the Jury at the 9th Moscow International Film Festival in 1975, the 10th Moscow International Film Festival in 1977, the 11th Moscow International Film Festival in 1979, the 12th Moscow International Film Festival in 1981 and the 13th Moscow International Film Festival in 1983. As a journalist he was a regular contributor to a number of film periodicals and biographical books, wrote about Sergei Eisenstein, Grigori Kozintsev, Andrei Moskvin and Leonid Bykov.

A long-time member of the Filmmakers' Union, he lost his place at the board during the infamous V Congress of the Soviet Filmmakers in 1986, being accused of "nepotism" and "political conformism" alongside Lev Kulidzhanov, Sergei Bondarchuk and other top directors. This led to a split, restructuring and further dramatic changes. Many critics and filmmakers consider it to be the start of the decline of the Soviet cinema.Feodor Razzakov, Industry of Betrayal, or Cinema That Blew Up the USSR Moscow: Algorithm, 2013, 416 p.  Rostotsky himself left the industry after finishing his final film From the Life of Fyodor Kuzkin in 1989. In his later interviews, he told that he had nothing left to say and that he was horrified by the current state of cinema. According to him, young people needed positive emotions, but instead the latest Soviet and Russian films and art in general relied primarily on vulgarity and instincts. The Dawns Here Are Quiet... interview with Stanislav Rostotsky by Pavel Gladnev, 1996 (in Russian)

 Late years 
During the 1990s Rostotsky spent a lot of time at his house near the Gulf of Finland, fishing, as this was his favourite hobby. He turned to cinema only once — to act in the 1998 TV mini-series At Daggers Drawn, an adaptation of the classic novel of the same name (director Alexandr Orlov). He also took part in the Window on Europe film festival in Vyborg.

Rostotsky died on 10 August 2001 on his way to the festival. He felt a strong pain in the chest and managed to pull the car over. His wife called the ambulance, but the doctors were unable to save him.Stanislav Rostotsky Died Behind the Wheel of His Favourite Car Komsomolskaya Pravda August 14, 2001 (in Russian) Stanislav Rostotsky was buried in Moscow on the Vagankovo Cemetery. In just a year his only son Andrei Rostotsky died tragically as he fell down a cliff while making preparations for his new movie.

 Filmography 
1955 — Land and People
1957 — It Happened in Penkovo
1959 — May Stars
1962 — Seven Winds
1963 — Winter Impressions
1965-66 — Hero of Our Time
1968 — We'll Live Till Monday
1972 — The Dawns Here Are Quiet
1974 — Under a Stone Sky
1977 — White Bim Black Ear
1979 — Profession: Film Actor
1980 — Squadron of Flying Hussars
1984 — Trees Grow on the Stones Too
1989 — From the Life of Fyodor Kuzkin

 Awards 
His 1968 film We'll Live Till Monday won the Golden Prize at the 6th Moscow International Film Festival.

Rostotsky's films The Dawns Here Are Quiet (1972) and White Bim Black Ear (1977) were both nominated for the Academy Award for Best Foreign Language Film, with the latter also winning the Crystal Globe at the Karlovy Vary International Film Festival.

References

External links

Stanislav Rostotsky at BFI
Ronald Bergan. Stanislav Rostotsky'' obituary at The Guardian, 3 October 2001

1922 births
2001 deaths
20th-century Russian male actors
Burials at Vagankovo Cemetery
Films directed by Stanislav Rostotsky
Gerasimov Institute of Cinematography alumni
Academic staff of the Gerasimov Institute of Cinematography
Lenin Prize winners
Male screenwriters
People from Rybinsk
People's Artists of the USSR
Recipients of the Order "For Merit to the Fatherland", 4th class
Recipients of the Order of Lenin
Recipients of the USSR State Prize
Russian film directors
Russian people of French descent
Russian people of Polish descent
20th-century Russian screenwriters
20th-century Russian male writers
Soviet film directors
Soviet male child actors
Soviet screenwriters
Soviet military personnel of World War II